The National Mediator of Norway (until 2012 Riksmeklingsmannen) is a mediator's office of Norway. It is invoked in labour disputes, in other words when creation or revision of tariff agreements is disagreed upon.

It was established in 1915, and the first National Mediator took office in 1916. The headquarters are in Oslo.

List of National Mediators of Norway
This is a list of the National Mediators of Norway:

1916–1920 : Jens Michael Lund
1920–1921 : Vilhelm Lie
1921–1922 : Paul Ivar Paulsen
1922–1930 : Valentin Voss
1931–1945 : Andreas Claussen
1946–1948 : Paal Berg
1948–1954 : Henrik Lundh
1954–1964 : Thoralf Evje
1965–1974 : Preben Munthe
1975–1981 : Konrad B. Knutsen
1982–1988 : Bjørn Haug
1988–2004 : Reidar Webster
2005–2009 : Svein Longva
2009–2009 : Geir Engebretsen (acting)
2009–2013 : Kari Gjesteby
2013–2018 : Nils Terje Dalseide
2018–present : Mats Wilhelm Ruland

References

Economy of Norway
Government of Norway
Organisations based in Oslo
1915 establishments in Norway